The Jurca MJ-9 1-Oh-Nine is a sports aircraft designed in France in 1972 as a replica of the Messerschmitt Bf 109 and marketed for homebuilding. It is one of many wooden homebuilt designs from Romanian born designer Marcel Jurca. Jurca was a Henschel Hs 129 pilot in World War II who moved to France in 1948. Plans for two versions were produced, the MJ-9, at 3/4 scale, and the MJ-90, at full-scale.

Variants
 MJ-9 - 3/4 scale version
 MJ-90 - full-scale version

Specifications (MJ-9)

References

 

French sport aircraft
Homebuilt aircraft
Replica aircraft
Jurca aircraft
Low-wing aircraft
Single-engined tractor aircraft